Pampakuda is a village and Panchayath part of  Muvattupuzha Taluk. It lies between Muvattupuzha and Piravom towns.
The village is on Highlands and consists of Rubber Plantations. Pampakuda is 10 km from Muvattupuzha. The Areekkal Waterfalls is situated here.

Pampakuda is known for two Churches Pampakuda Valiyapally (St Johns Orthodox Church ) and Pampakuda Cheriyapally(St Thomas orthodox Church).
Tomb of First Catholicose (Murimattathil Bava) of Malankara Orthodox church was in Pampakuda Cheriyapally.

Location

 

Cities and towns in Ernakulam district
Neighbourhoods in Kochi